Toradi (also, Torady) is a village and municipality in the Astara Rayon of Azerbaijan.  It has a population of 820.

References 

Populated places in Astara District